PGA Tour China is a China-based men's professional golf tour as part of the PGA Tour's global expansion. The tour started in 2014. After a hiatus in 2017, the tour resumed in 2018. It is known as PGA Tour Series China. An earlier tour, the Omega China Tour, ran from 2004 to 2009.

The United States-based PGA Tour started PGA Tour China in 2014, joining PGA Tour Canada and PGA Tour Latinoamérica as international developmental tours. Similar to the Canadian and Latinoamerica tours, PGA Tour China offers a path to the Korn Ferry Tour for top finishers. It also offers Official World Golf Ranking points to the top-six finishers at each tournament. The top five finishers on the Order of Merit at season's end receive promotion to the Korn Ferry Tour. The money leader is fully exempt, while the other four players receive conditional status. Those who place second through tenth on the Order of Merit advance to the Korn Ferry Tour Qualifying Tournament's final stage. The top-50 players on the Order of Merit at the end of the season retain PGA Tour China privileges for the following year.

On 29 January 2014, PGA Tour China announced qualifying procedures and a 12-event season to begin in April. Two 72-hole qualifying tournaments were played in March. Each event awarded 20 full-time Tour cards, and conditional cards to the next 20 players plus those tied. For its inaugural season, PGA Tour China gave exemptions to the top 70 according to the China Golf Association rankings. After the 40 qualifiers and 70 from the rankings, the balance of the fields were filled through sponsor exemptions, Monday qualifiers and eligible players from the Web.com Tour, PGA Tour Latinoamérica, and PGA Tour Canada.

Zhang Lianwei, China's most successful professional golfer, hit the first tee shot in PGA Tour China history. South Korean teenager Wang Jeung-hun dominated the season's first event, the Mission Hills Haikou Open, winning by what is still a tournament record 10 shots.

Teenager Li Haotong won the final two events of the 2014 season, the Hainan Open and the Tour Championship – and three tournaments overall – to capture Player of the Year honors and full access to the Web.com Tour. Li later played on the European Tour, where he was an event in 2006. Another notable winner was China's Jin Cheng, a 16-year-old amateur who came from behind on the final day of the Nine Dragons Open to pass Lucas Lee. The victory by Jin is still the only time an amateur has broken through and won. Brett Drewitt finished third on the Order of Merit and also advanced to the Web.com Tour. After two seasons on that circuit, Drewitt earned his PGA Tour card for the 2016–17 season.

In 2015, New Zealand's Josh Geary won three tournaments, matching the win total of Li. But it was Australia's Bryden Macpherson, having returned to China for the second half of the season after failing to qualify for the Web.com Tour Finals, who finished atop the Order of Merit for a return trip to the Web.com Tour in 2016. Midway during the 2015 season, the series was renamed Ping An Bank China Tour – PGA Tour China Series after Ping An Bank became the tour's umbrella sponsor.

Another teenager from China dominated the third season, in 2016. Nineteen-year-old Dou Zecheng defeated Zhang Xinjun in the season-opening Henan Open, and Dou just kept winning. He eventually captured four titles, setting a record for single-season earnings CN¥1,144,350. The University of Oklahoma's Charlie Saxon won two tournaments and finished second on the Order of Merit. Dou was prominently featured in a Fortune article that appeared during the 2016 season. The Tour also made history by hosting its first tournament outside of Mainland China, the Clearwater Bay Open at Clearwater Bay Golf & Country Club in Hong Kong. In 2017, Dou became the first Chinese player to win on the Web.com Tour and graduated to the PGA Tour.

2020 season
The 2020 season was announced in January with a 14 tournament schedule which ventured outside Greater China for the first time with the Phuket Championship in Thailand. Due to the COVID-19 pandemic, the season was initially postponed, before being cancelled in late July, with all exemptions being carried forward to 2021. Earlier in July, China had announced the cancellation all international sporting events for the year. All players who qualified for the PGA Tour China during the 2020 season were eligible for the LocaliQ Series.

Schedule

2019 season

Schedule
The following table lists official events during the 2019 season.

Order of Merit
The Order of Merit was based on prize money won during the season, calculated in Renminbi. The top five players on the tour earned status to play on the 2020–21 Korn Ferry Tour.

2018 season

Schedule
The following table lists official events during the 2018 season.

Order of Merit
The Order of Merit was based on prize money won during the season, calculated in Renminbi. The top five players on the tour earned status to play on the 2019 Korn Ferry Tour.

2016 season

Schedule
The following table lists official events during the 2016 season.

Order of Merit
The Order of Merit was based on prize money won during the season, calculated in Renminbi. The top five players on the tour earned status to play on the 2017 Web.com Tour.

2015 season

Schedule
The following table lists official events during the 2015 season.

Order of Merit
The Order of Merit was based on prize money won during the season, calculated in Renminbi. The top five players on the tour earned status to play on the 2016 Web.com Tour.

2014 season

Schedule
The following table lists official events during the 2014 season.

Order of Merit
The Order of Merit was based on prize money won during the season, calculated in Renminbi. The top five players on the tour earned status to play on the 2015 Web.com Tour.

Order of Merit winners

Notes

References

External links

Golf in China
Professional golf tours